The Topolnița is a left tributary of the river Danube in Romania. In the central Mehedinți Plateau it descends into Topolnița Cave, eventually emerging at the foot of a hill downstream. It discharges into the Danube in Drobeta-Turnu Severin.

References

Rivers of Romania
Rivers of Mehedinți County